Katarina Srebotnik and Bob Bryan were the defending champions, but Srebtonik did not compete in the Mixed Doubles tournament at this U.S. Open. Bryan partnered Vera Zvonareva, and successfully defended the title, defeating Alicia Molik and Todd Woodbridge in the final 6–3, 6–4.

Seeds

  Rennae Stubbs /  Daniel Nestor (semifinal)
  Cara Black /  Wayne Black (second round)
  Lisa Raymond /  Mahesh Bhupathi (second round)
  Vera Zvonareva /  Bob Bryan (champions)
  Elena Likhovtseva /  Nenad Zimonjić (Quarterfinal)
  Ai Sugiyama /  Kevin Ullyett (second round)
  Virginia Ruano Pascual /  Jared Palmer (second round)
  Martina Navratilova /  Leander Paes (semifinal)

Draw

Finals

Top half

Bottom half

External links
WTA Draw
2004 US Open – Doubles draws and results at the International Tennis Federation

Mixed Doubles
US Open (tennis) by year – Mixed doubles